Ben Kotwica (born, December 8, 1974) is an American football coach who is the special teams coordinator for the Denver Broncos of the National Football League (NFL).

Career
Kotwica was a linebacker and team captain for Army from 1993-1996. Before his career in coaching, Kotwica served in the United States Army as a helicopter pilot, reaching the rank of Captain by 2004. In addition to missions in Bosnia and Herzegovina and Korea, he is a veteran of the Iraq War.

New York Jets
In 2007, Kotwica was hired by the New York Jets to be their defense/special teams quality control coach. In 2013, Kotwica was promoted to special teams coordinator.

Washington Redskins
On January 15, 2014, the Washington Redskins announced Kotwica as their special teams coordinator, serving under newly appointed head coach, Jay Gruden. After coaching five seasons with the Redskins, Kotwica requested and was granted permission to interview with other teams.

Atlanta Falcons
The Atlanta Falcons announced that Kotwica was hired as their new special teams coordinator on January 9, 2019. Kotwica was fired on October 12, 2020.

Minnesota Vikings
On February 23, 2022, Kotwica was hired by the Minnesota Vikings to serve as the team's assistant special teams coach for the 2022 season.

Denver Broncos
On February 25, 2023, Kotwica was hired by the Denver Broncos as their special teams coordinator under new head coach, Sean Payton.

References

External links
Denver Broncos bio

Living people
New York Jets coaches
Washington Redskins coaches
1974 births
Minnesota Vikings coaches